Veit Hans Schnorr (15 March 1644 in Schneeberg, Saxony - 26 January 1715 in Schneeberg) was a German iron and cobalt magnate.

1644 births
1715 deaths
Businesspeople from Saxony
Mining in the Ore Mountains
People from Schneeberg, Saxony
German mining businesspeople